George Tibbits (1763–1849) was an American politician. Other notable people of that name include:

 George Mortimer Tibbits (1796–1878), an American livestock farmer, son of the above
 George Tibbits (composer) (1933–2008), an Australian composer and architect

See also 

 George W. Tibbetts